Sweat Lodge Infinite is a solo studio album by American rapper 2Mex. It was released on Temporary Whatever in 2003. Entirely produced by Longevity, it features guest appearances from Aceyalone, Busdriver, Kemit, Existereo, Liferexall, St. Mark 9:23, and Awol One.

Critical reception

David Morris of PopMatters gave the album a mixed review, saying, "2Mex falls short of bringing truly next level shit, but he's really doing his damnedest, and there's definite pleasure to be had in hearing him reach." Thomas Quinlan of Exclaim! called it "a good album with a nice unified sound." He stated that "Longevity's production is primarily minimal drum-programming and unusual sound effects, while Mixmaster Wolf layers plenty of scratches that give the tracks more depth." Dave Segal of XLR8R wrote: "From the militant first track, 'Obey,' with its grandiose horn stabs, scratches from Breakestra's Mixmaster Wolf, and hypnotic organ riff, 2Mex thrusts you into the apocalyptic funkiness and exhilarating existentialism of golden-era crews like Public Enemy, X Clan and Poor Righteous Teachers."

Track listing

Personnel
Credits adapted from liner notes.

 2Mex – vocals
 Longevity – additional vocals, production
 Aceyalone – vocals (4, 12)
 Busdriver – vocals (6, 8)
 Kemit – vocals (6, 8)
 Existereo – vocals (8)
 Liferexall – vocals (11)
 St. Mark 9:23 – vocals (11)
 Awol One – vocals (12)
 Mixmaster Wolf – turntables
 Daddy Kev – mixing

References

External links
 

2003 albums
2Mex albums